Anakkara may refer to:
 
Anakkara (Palakkad), a village in Palakkad district in Kerala state, India
Anakkara (Idukki), a village in Idukki district in Kerala state, India